Eight Liberal Democrat Members of Parliament (MPs) were elected to the House of Commons of the United Kingdom at the 2015 general election. Another seat was won in the 2016 Richmond Park by-election.

MPs

See also
 List of MPs elected in the 2015 United Kingdom general election
 List of MPs for constituencies in England 2015–17
 List of MPs for constituencies in Northern Ireland 2015–17
 List of MPs for constituencies in Scotland 2015–17
 List of MPs for constituencies in Wales 2015–17
 Members of the House of Lords
 :Category:UK MPs 2015–2017

References

2015-17
Liberal Democrat